The Palmolive Building, formerly the Playboy Building, is a 37-story Art Deco building at 919 N. Michigan Avenue in Chicago. Built by Holabird & Root, it was completed in 1929 and was home to the Colgate-Palmolive-Peet Corporation.

The Palmolive Building was renamed the Playboy Building in 1965 when Playboy Enterprises purchased the leasehold of the building.  It was home to the editorial and business offices of Playboy magazine from that time until 1989 when Playboy moved its offices to 680 N Lake Shore Drive. Playboy had sold the leasehold in 1980 and signed a 10-year lease that expired in 1990.  The new leaseholder renamed the building 919 North Michigan Avenue.

During the time that Playboy was in the building, the word P-L-A-Y-B-O-Y was spelled out in  illuminated letters on the north and south roofline. The building was designated a Chicago Landmark in 2000, and it was added to the federal National Register of Historic Places in 2003.

In 2001, the building was sold to developer Draper and Kramer who, with Booth Hansen Architects, converted it to residential use with the first two floors dedicated to upscale office and retail space.  High-end condos make up the rest of the building.  The new owners restored the building's name to the Palmolive Building.  The business address remains 919 North Michigan Avenue; however, the residential address is 159 East Walton Place.  Notable residents of the building include Vince Vaughn, who bought a 12,000-square-foot triplex penthouse encompassing the 35th, 36th and 37th floors for $12 million.  In February 2013, Vaughn offered the penthouse for sale as a pocket listing for $24.9 million. However, after multiple price cuts he chose in May 2016 to divide the unit in two, offering one for $8.5 million, and the other smaller unit for $4.2 million.

Lindbergh Beacon

A beacon named for the aviator Charles Lindbergh was added to the building in 1930. It rotated a full 360 degrees and was intended to help guide airplanes safely to Midway Airport.  The beacon beamed for several decades, and ceased operation in 1981 following complaints from residents of nearby buildings. During the Palmolive Building's conversion to condominiums in the late 2000s, the beacon was modified to rotate back and forth, always pointing towards the waterfront, so as to avoid shining light into other buildings. Subsequently, the historic beacon resumed operation.

See also
 Chicago architecture
 List of tallest buildings in Chicago

References

External links

 Palmolive Building Landmark Residences 
 Palmolive Building
 Palmolive Building History on Chicagology

Art Deco architecture in Illinois
Art Deco skyscrapers
Commercial buildings completed in 1929
Commercial buildings on the National Register of Historic Places in Chicago
Magazine headquarters
Mass media company headquarters in the United States
Skyscraper office buildings in Chicago
Playboy
Residential condominiums in Chicago
Residential skyscrapers in Chicago
Projects by Holabird & Root
Chicago Landmarks
Streeterville, Chicago
1929 establishments in Illinois